Pakhura (Pihu) was an Egyptian commissioner in the "Land of Retenu" (Canaan) mentioned in the Amarna letters. He probably served under Pharaoh Amenhotep III and/or Akhenaten. In EA 122, Rib-Hadda, king of Byblos, complained of an attack by Pakhura, who killed a number of Byblos' Shardana mercenaries and took captive three of Rib-Hadda's men.

References
 I. E. S. Edwards, C. J. Gadd, N. G. L. Hammond, E. Sollberger, eds., The Cambridge Ancient History, Cambridge University Press 1973
 Epiphanius Wilson, Egyptian Literature, The Colonial Press 1901, p.212
 Charles Francis Horne, The Sacred Books and Early Literature of the East, Kessinger Publishing 2001, p.288

Amarna letters officials